John Barrie (6 May 191724 March 1980) was an English actor who appeared in a number of television shows and films. He became well known for playing the title character on the police series Sergeant Cork from 1963–1968 and playing Detective Inspector Hudson on Z-Cars from 1967–1968.
He was born in New Brighton, Cheshire in 1917 and made his screen debut in the 1954 film Yankee Pasha. He retired from acting in the 1970s, and latterly owned a number of grocery shops around York.

Selected filmography
 Yankee Pasha (1954) - Hayseed Townsman (uncredited)
 Victim (1961) - Det.Inspector Harris
 Life for Ruth (1962) - Mr. Gordon
 The Wild and the Willing (1962) - Mr. Corbett
 Lancelot and Guinevere (1963) - Sir Bevidere
 The Oblong Box (1969) - Supt. Sloane
 The File of the Golden Goose (1969) - Franklin
 Patton (1970) - Air Vice-Marshal Sir Arthur Coningham
 Song of Norway (1970) - Mr. Hagerup

Selected television appearances
 ITV Play of the Week (1958–1967) - Frank Jarrett / Henry Hobson / James Kennion / Edward Timbrell
 Armchair Theatre (1958–1961) - Mr. Chard / Chick / Gracey
 Emergency – Ward 10 (1959–1960) - R.S.O. Miller / Sgt. Woolley
 Deadline Midnight (1961) - McLaren
 Coronation Street (1961–1972) - Jimmy Frazer / Lenny Phillips
 Z-Cars (1962–1968) - Det. Chief Insp. Hudson / Porter / Stephen Peake
 The Saint (1963-1966) - Coleman / Elliot Vascoe
 Sergeant Cork (1963–1968) - Sergeant Cork
 The Sullavan Brothers (1965) - P.C. Turner
 The Doctors (1969–1971) - Dr. John Somers

References

External links
 

1917 births
1980 deaths
English male television actors
English male film actors
20th-century English male actors